Leistus spinibarbis is a species of ground beetle native to Europe, the Near East and North Africa. In Europe, it is found in Albania, Austria, Benelux, Great Britain including the Isle of Man, Bulgaria, Corsica, Crete, the Cyclades, Cyprus, the Dodecanese, European Turkey, mainland France, Germany, mainland Greece, Hungary, mainland Italy, Liechtenstein, Poland, mainland Portugal, southern Russia, Sardinia, Sicily, mainland Spain, Switzerland, Ukraine and all the states of former Yugoslavia.

References

External links
Global Biodiversity Information Facility

Nebriinae
Beetles described in 1775
Beetles of Europe
Taxa named by Johan Christian Fabricius